Ran-binding protein 9 is a protein that in humans is encoded by the RANBP9 gene.

Function 

This gene encodes a protein that binds RAN, a small GTP binding protein belonging to the RAS superfamily that is essential for the translocation of RNA and proteins through the nuclear pore complex. The protein encoded by this gene has also been shown to interact with several other proteins, including met proto-oncogene, homeodomain interacting protein kinase 2, androgen receptor, and cyclin-dependent kinase 11.

Interactions 

RANBP9 has been shown to interact with:

 Androgen receptor, 
 C-Met, 
 DISC1, 
 DYRK1B, 
 Glucocorticoid receptor, 
 HIPK2 
 MKLN1,
 S100A7,  and
 USP11.

References

Further reading

External links